Dan Claitor is an American politician. He served as a Republican member for the 16th district of the Louisiana State Senate.

Claitor was born in Baton Rouge, Louisiana. He attended Louisiana State University, where he earned a bachelor's degree, and then earned a Juris Doctor degree at Loyola University New Orleans. In 2009, Claitor won the election for the 16th district of the Louisiana State Senate. He succeeded Bill Cassidy. In 2014, Claitor was a candidate for the 6th congressional district of the United States House of Representatives, but was not elected. In 2020, he was succeeded by Franklin Foil for the 16th district.

References 

Living people
Year of birth missing (living people)
Politicians from Baton Rouge, Louisiana
Republican Party Louisiana state senators
21st-century American politicians
Louisiana State University alumni
Loyola University New Orleans alumni